Kannamangalam Sreekumar Harisankar (born 18 November 1993), popularly known as K. S. Harisankar, is an Indian playback singer and music producer who predominantly works in Malayalam cinema. Some of his popular songs are "Nilaavum Maayunnu" from Ennum Eppozhum, Jeevamshamayi from Theevandi, "Pavizhamazhaye" from Athiran, "Aval" from Kakshi: Amminippilla and "Nee Himamazhayaay" from Edakkad Battalion 06.

Early life
Harisankar was born on 18 November 1993 to musicians Alappuzha K. S. Sreekumar and Kamala Lekshmi. He was trained by his grandmother K. Omanakutty and his father. He is the sororal grandnephew of musicians M. G. Radhakrishnan and M. G. Sreekumar.

Career
Harisankar sang for the movie Saphalyam with K. J. Yesudas at the age of four in 1997 and for the devotional album Sabarimala with M. G. Sreekumar in 1998.

He graduated BDS from PMS College of Dental Science & Research, Vattapara, and practiced at a clinic for six months. Then he opted out from medical practicing and focused on katcheris and film songs.

Harisankar is the winner of the AIR classical competition in 2008 and an accredited Grade B artiste. He won the Kerala regional final of the M. S. Subbulakshmi Award 2016 held in Kochi.

His first song, "Kaatte Chaariya Vaathil", for the 2014 film Karanavar was penned by O. N. V. Kurup and composed by Ouseppachan, but the first song which came out was "Payye Payye" from the film Ormayundo Ee Mukham.

Harisankar formed a band with his friends named Pragathi in 2015. It has become a near-constant pick for pro-shows in Thiruvananthapuram. His brother Ravisankar, a violinist, is also a part of the band. 

Harisankar also releases singles and covers from his YouTube channel.

Personal life
Harisankar married Gadha Sidharthan on 21 May 2017 at Thiruvananthapuram.

Awards

 2019 - SIIMA for Best Male Playback Singer (Malayalam) for the song Pavizhamazhaye from Athiran

References

External links
 
 Official YouTube channel

1993 births
Living people
Male Carnatic singers
Carnatic singers
Indian male playback singers
Malayalam playback singers
Malayali people
Singers from Thiruvananthapuram
21st-century Indian male singers
21st-century Indian singers